Falling Springs is a ghost town in Los Angeles County, California. All that remains of the community is some abandoned vacation cabins, many of which have burned down. The cabins had most recently been occupied by a religious group. Before a forest fire burned through the area several years ago, the cabins had been heavily vandalized. Because of abundant water from springs and the creek, the cabin area is now heavily overgrown including abundant poison oak, blocked by numerous burned, fallen trees, and virtually impassable.

References

Former settlements in Los Angeles County, California
Former populated places in California